"Break My Heart (You Really)", also known as "Break My Heart", is a song by British pop act Shakespears Sister, released in 1988 as the lead single from their debut album Sacred Heart. "Break My Heart (You Really)" was released in most territories as a Double A-side with "Heroine", which according to Siobhan Fahey was to "give a more rounded picture of what I'm about". In North American territories however, both songs were released as separate A-side singles.

Music video 

The music video, directed by Sophie Muller, features a tense-looking man sitting on a chair before a colourful stage. On stage, Fahey sings the song, as various carnival performers – including a juggler, a contortionist, a strongman, a fire eater, dancers, and more – appear alongside her.

Track listing 
Double A-side CD single
"Break My Heart (You Really)" (Shep Pettibone House Mix) — 7:25
"Break My Heart (You Really)" (7" Version) — 3:32
"Heroine" (Extended Version) — 5:33

Double A-side 7" single
"Break My Heart (You Really)" — 3:29
"Heroine" — 3:45

US 12" single
"Break My Heart" (Copa Mix) — 6:43
"Break My Heart" (Break My Dub) — 3:50
"Break My Heart" (Instrumental) — 3:44
"Break My Heart" (Yesterday, Today Mix) — 8:08
"Run Silent" (Revolution Mix) — 7:15

Canadian 12" single
"Break My Heart (You Really)" (Shep Pettibone House Mix) — 7:22
"Break My Heart (You Really)" (7" Version) — 3:30
"Break My Heart (You Really)" (Dub Mix) — 6:28
"You Made Me Come to This" — 3:10

12" promo single
"Break My Heart (You Really)" (Shep Pettibone House Mix) — 7:25
"Break My Heart (You Really)" (Dub Mix) — 7:53
"Pretty Boy" — 3:37

References 

1988 debut singles
Shakespears Sister songs
Songs written by Marcella Detroit
Songs written by Siobhan Fahey
Songs written by Richard Feldman (songwriter)
1988 songs